George Rogers House may refer to:

George Rogers House (Portsmouth, New Hampshire), listed on the National Register of Historic Places (NRHP)
George Rogers House (Lake Oswego, Oregon), listed on the NRHP

See also
Rogers House (disambiguation)